Stephen Anthony Hartgen (September 30, 1944 – December 31, 2021) was an American politician who was a member of the Idaho House of Representatives, serving from 2008 to 2018. He was a member of the Republican Party.

Personal life and death
Hartgen was born in Baltimore, Maryland, on September 30, 1944, as the son of artist and University of Maine professor Vincent Hartgen. He earned his bachelor's degree in history from Amherst College, his master's in American history from Brandeis University, and his doctorate in American history from the University of Minnesota.

He died on December 31, 2021, at the age of 77.

Career
Hartgen was a business consultant and a former editor and publisher of the Times-News.

In July 2008, after the death of Senator Tom Gannon, the Legislative District 23 Republican Central Committee met to fill the vacancy in the Idaho Senate seat and replace Gannon's name on the upcoming general election ballot. The committee selected then-Representative Bert Brackett of Rogerson to replace Gannon's name on the ballot and sent three names in order of preference to Governor Butch Otter to fill the vacancy: Brackett, Hartgen, and Jeanne Gannon of Buhl, the widow of Senator Gannon. Otter appointed Brackett to serve the remainder of Gannon's term. The committee met again to fill the vacancy in the Idaho House of Representatives from Brackett's appointment to the Senate and replace Brackett's name for representative on the upcoming general election ballot. The committee selected Hartgen to replace Brackett's name on the ballot for Representative and sent three names in order of preference to Otter to fill the vacancy: Hartgen, former Representative Gene Winchester, of Homedale, and Doran Parkins, of Marsing. Otter appointed Hartgen to serve the remainder of Brackett's term in the House.

Committee assignments
Commerce and Human Resources Committee (chairman)
Environment, Energy, and Technology Committee
Revenue and Taxation Committee
Hartgen previously served on the Education Committee from 2008 to 2012.

Elections

References

External links
Stephen Hartgen at the Idaho Legislature

1944 births
2021 deaths
21st-century American politicians
Amherst College alumni
Brandeis University alumni
Republican Party members of the Idaho House of Representatives
People from Twin Falls, Idaho
Politicians from Baltimore
University of Minnesota College of Liberal Arts alumni